SHAC redirects to Stop Huntingdon Animal Cruelty, an international campaign against animal testing.

It may also refer to:

Student Health Action Coalition, the oldest student-run free clinic in the United States
Second Historical Archives of China, in Nanjing, Jiangsu, China
Society for the History of Alchemy and Chemistry

See also 
Shack
Shak (disambiguation)